Abbakumovo is a rural locality (a village) in Pekshinskoye Rural Settlement, Petushinsky District, Vladimir Oblast, Russia. The population was 50 as of 2010. There are 8 streets.

Geography 
The village is located on the bank of the Peksha River, 23 km east of Petushki (the district's administrative centre) by road. Zheltukhino is the nearest rural locality.

References 

Rural localities in Petushinsky District
Pokrovsky Uyezd